Night of the Demon is a 1980 American horror film directed by James C. Wasson, written by Jim L. Ball and Mike Williams, and starring Michael Cutt, Joy Allen, Robert Collings, Jodi Lazarus, Richard Fields, Michael Lang, and Melanie Graham. The film centers on an anthropologist who, along with a group of his pupils, embarks on an expedition to prove the existence of Bigfoot in a rural region of Northern California, only to be stalked and systematically slaughtered by the creature.

Completed in 1979, the film was first released on VHS in the United States in 1983. Due to its graphic violence, the film was deemed a "video nasty" by the British Board of Film Classification, and underwent heavy censorship in the United Kingdom. It later received a DVD release from Code Red in 2011, sourced from a tape master. In November 2021, Severin Films issued the film for the first time on Blu-ray, featuring a 2K scan from the original film elements, which were previously alleged to be lost.

Plot 
Bill Nugent, an anthropology professor, is approached by Carla Thomas, a young woman whose father was murdered in the woods in Northern California. She suspects that his death was caused by a Bigfoot who, according to legend, resides in the woods in the region. Despite a number of disappearances and brutal murdersincluding the death of a young couple, the manual emasculation of a biker, and the butchering of two Girl Scoutspolice have deemed the theory of a Bigfoot being responsible a hoax. Carla requests to accompany Bill along with four of his studentsRoy, Pete, Gary, and Lindaon an expedition aiming to prove Bigfoot's existence.

They embark by boat along a river, and first camp on the property of an elderly man, Lou Carlson, who has claimed to witness the Bigfoot. Lou allows them to stay but is evasive when they attempt to speak to him. When one of the students, Roy, bribes Lou with alcohol, Lou suggests they seek out Wanda, a recluse who resides deep in the woods, and supposedly holds more information about the Bigfoot. Meanwhile, a hunter camping nearby is attacked and impaled by the Bigfoot on a jagged branch.

The next day, Nugent and his five companions visit the nearby town, where they glean from locals more information about Wanda: She is the daughter of a deranged preacher, Emmet McGinty, whose followers were rumored to engage in inbreeding, cannibalism, and human sacrifice. Emmet has since committed suicide. After learning of this, the group returns to the woods. That night, after the five have fallen asleep, they are awoken by the sound of chanting. Bill and Roy follow the sound, and stumble upon a Satanic sexual ritual involving Wanda around an effigy of Bigfoot; among the practitioners is a local sheriff. Bill interrupts the ritual by firing a gun, causing the cultists to scatter.

In the morning, Bill and the others find their boat missing, and large footprints left on the shore. After making plaster casts of the footprints, they push onward. That night, the Bigfoot attacks Linda and Gary while the two have sex, but they survive. The group eventually reach Wanda's cabin, bribing her with candy, but she has a nervous breakdown when the Bigfoot is mentioned. That night, Pete is attacked by the Bigfoot, who causes him to shoot himself with his rifle. The others attempt to locate Pete, but find he has disappeared.

Bill decides to hypnotize Wanda the next day, causing her to recall her abusive childhood: As a teenager, Wanda was brutally raped by the Bigfoot, an event Emmet had witnessed in horror. Convinced the beast was a demon, Emmet unsuccessfully attempted to induce an abortion by forcing Wanda to drink poison. Wanda eventually gave birth to the mutant half-human child, but Emmet killed it moments after its birth. In retaliation, Wanda burned her father alive in his barn, staging it to look like a suicide.

Hoping to find evidence of Wanda's Bigfoot child, Bill explores a cemetery nearby, where he digs up the skeletal remains of the infant Bigfoot, which appear to be more animal than human. The Bigfoot appears in the cemetery, and absconds with its dead spawn as Bill and the others fearfully barricade themselves in Wanda's cabin. Hours later, the Bigfoot hangs Pete's mutilated body on the porch before breaking into the home. Ignoring a dissonantly calm Wanda, the Bigfoot strangles Carla to death as the others barricade themselves in the kitchen. The Bigfoot breaks into the kitchen, where he disembowels Gary. Roy attempts to stop him, but the Bigfoot smashes his head through the window and cuts his throat on the glass, before impaling Linda with a pitchfork. Finally, the Bigfoot burns Bill's face on the hot stove, leaving him for dead.

Sometime later, Bill lies helplessly in a hospital bed, having been found unconscious in the woods, his face horribly burned. When detectives inquire about Carla and the four students, all of whom are missing, Bill recounts his version of events to them. Both the police and attending doctors receive his story with disbelief, and the hospital psychologist deems him criminally insane.

Cast

Production

Filming
By cinematographer John Quick's recollection, the film's budget was approximately $70,000. Quick had worked with producer Jim L. Ball previously on a 1964 feature he had filmed while attending the University of Southern California entitled Fraternity of Horror.

Principal photography took place in 1979, with the exterior sequences being largely filmed in Valencia, California, near Six Flags Magic Mountain, as well as other undeveloped areas outside Los Angeles. Additional filming locations include at the Feedbin feed store in Malibu, as well as producer Jim L. Ball's private studio on La Brea Avenue, which is where the interior cabin sequences were filmed. The college campus featured in the beginning of the film is that of Immaculate Heart College.

Post-production
Following the film's completion, a small showing was held largely for cast and crew members, which led to a second screening at a local Los Angeles film festival. After the film performed poorly with audiences at the festival, producer Jim L. Ball shot numerous gore-filled sequences to insert into the film, retrofitting it in a way that each of the graphic murders are told through flashback, and serve as the anthropology students' impetus to capture the bigfoot. According to director James C. Wasson, he had no involvement in the filming of these scenes, and his original cut of the film was much more tame. The final sequence in which the bigfoot murders the remaining students in the cabin was filmed in a makeshift studio in producer Ball's garage in Los Angeles.

Release

Censorship
Due its depiction of brutal violence, Night of the Demon was listed as a "video nasty" by the British Board of Film Classification. It remained banned in the United Kingdom until January 1994, when VIPCO resubmitted it to the BBFC, who agreed to pass it with an 18 certificate as long as one minute and forty-one seconds' worth of gore was deleted. Almost all of the violent scenes were trimmed, but the castration of the biker and the removal of a student's intestines (for use as a flail) were removed completely.

Critical response  
Devon Bertsch of Digital Retribution wrote, "When the Bigfoot is off screen, it is admittedly hard to overlook the film's many, many flaws. Indeed everything that is not the Bigfoot is highly flawed, and even the Bigfoot himself looks pretty crap. The acting, script, FX and the often incongruous score are laughable, but add to the film's wacko charm." A 2½ out of 5 was given to the film by Justin Kerswell of Hysteria Lives!, who called it "undoubtedly the best of the worst of the early 80s backwoods slashers". Dread Central's Chris Haberman stated, "Is this a 'so-bad-it's-good' movie? No. This is one of those rare, largely forgotten films that was taken so seriously by its creators that it is difficult to imagine a large team of people reading the script, enjoying it, coming on-board, and putting in the time and energy to bring the terrible story to life. As such, this is an 'I-must-have-a-fever' movie, because most of what you'll see may feel like a hallucination" and "The film has plenty of problems, but I think the reason its supporters still stand beside this freakshow is that the film works hard to entertain. No matter how clumsy the dialogue and effects may be, these cats were trying to be taken seriously, and the result is too angry and depraved to be considered a lazy cash-in or mocking parody piece. The filmmakers' intention to make an earnestly mean and perverted film is undeniable, and that weird essence turns even the most absurdly executed set pieces into memorable mindfuckers".

Film scholar Scott Von Doviak wrote of the film's representation of violence: "It's a repugnant piece of work all around, yet Night of the Demon earns its place in motion picture history simply by getting more out of the phrase "horribly mutilated" than any other movie ever made."

Rob Hunter of Film School Rejects wrote that the film "is played completely straight, but Night of the Demon is gloriously bonkers."

Home media
The film was released on VHS in the United States in 1983 by the Los Angeles-based home video company VCII, Inc., who reissued it in 1986. Gemstone Entertainment released another VHS edition in 1987. Vipco released the film on VHS in the United Kingdom on September 13, 1993, though, according to the British Board of Film Classification, cuts were made to the film for this release.

It was later released for the first time on DVD by Black Horse on November 1, 2004, and by Vidtape on November 30 that same year. Code Red released the film as a part of its Maria's "B" Movie Mayhem series on October 11, 2011. It was last released by Mr Fat-W Video on June 21, 2016.

On November 26, 2021, Severin Films released the film for the first time on Blu-ray, launching it as part of their annual Black Friday online sale. Additionally, Severin released a new novelization of the film by Brad Carter, as well as various limited memorabilia, including keychains, figurines, and a small number of bigfoot masks replicated from the mask used in the film.

Notes

References

Sources

External links 
 
 
 

1980 films
1980 directorial debut films
1980 horror films
1980s horror thriller films
1980 independent films
1980s exploitation films
1980s monster movies
1980s mystery films
1980s slasher films
1980s teen horror films
American exploitation films
American horror thriller films
American independent films
American monster movies
American natural horror films
American nonlinear narrative films
American slasher films
American splatter films
American teen horror films
Backwoods slasher films
Bigfoot films
Films about child abuse
Films about cults
Films about dysfunctional families
Films about educators
Films about mass murder
Films about orphans
Films about rape
Films based on urban legends
Films about hypnosis
Films scored by Dennis McCarthy
Films set in California
Films set in forests
Films originally rejected by the British Board of Film Classification
Religious horror films
Scouting in popular culture
Teenage pregnancy in film
Zoophilia in culture
1980s English-language films
1980s American films